Danny Del-Re (born 12 February 1968) is a former Australian rules footballer who played for Footscray in the AFL during the early 1990s.

Del-Re spent five seasons with Footscray, topping their goalkicking in 1992 and 1993. The 1992 season was his most prolific; he kicked 70 goals, including 13 of them in the finals series. He kicked 8 goals, a club record for a finals match, in the 1992 Qualifying Final against Geelong at the MCG.

Following his time in the AFL, he moved to SANFL club South Adelaide in 1995 where he booted 90 goals. In 1996 he returned to Williamstown in the VFA, where he had played from 1987-89 before moving to Footscray. He played with Williamstown until the end of 1999 and totalled 114 games and 246 goals. He was vice-captain of the team in his last two year with the Seagulls. Del-Re played in losing grand finals in 1988 and 1989 but did win a premiership with Williamstown Thirds in 1987, the year he made his senior debut. He was the Club's leading goalkicker in 1998 with 60 goals and 1999 with 49 goals, and won the Club best and fairest award in 1998 and was runner-up in 1989. Del-Re was named at centre half-forward in the WFC 1990's Team-of-the-Decade.

External links

1968 births
Living people
Western Bulldogs players
South Adelaide Football Club players
Williamstown Football Club players
Australian rules footballers from Victoria (Australia)